Gilvan or Gilavan may refer to:
 Gilavan, Ardabil
 Gilvan, Zanjan
 Gilvan Rural District, in Zanjan Province